Allison Henrich (born 1980) is an American mathematician specializing in knot theory and also interested in undergraduate-level mathematics research mentorship. She is a professor of mathematics at Seattle University.

Education and career
Henrich entered college planning for an undergraduate teaching career,
graduated in 2003 from the University of Washington with a double major in mathematics and philosophy. She completed a Ph.D. at Dartmouth College in 2008. Her dissertation, A Sequence of Degree One Vassiliev Invariants for Virtual Knots, was supervised by Vladimir Chernov. At Dartmouth, Carolyn S. Gordon became another faculty mentor.

She joined the Seattle University mathematics faculty in 2009, and was promoted to full professor in 2019.

Books
Henrich is the coauthor of a book on knot theory, An Interactive Introduction to Knot Theory (with Inga Johnson, Dover Publications, 2017). She also coauthored the book A Mathematician’s Practical Guide to Mentoring Undergraduate Research (with Michael Dorff and Lara Pudwell, Mathematical Association of America, American Mathematical Society, and Council on Undergraduate Research, 2019).

With Emille D. Lawrence, Matthew Pons, and David Taylor, she co-edited the book Living Proof: Stories of Resilience Along the Mathematical Journey (American Mathematical Society and Mathematical Association of America, 2019). She is also an editor of Knots, Links, Spatial Graphs, and Algebraic Invariants (with Erica Flapan, Aaron Kaestner, and Sam Nelson, American Mathematical Society, 2017).

Recognition
In 2015, the Mathematical Association of America gave Henrich their Henry L. Alder Award for Distinguished Teaching by a Beginning College or University Mathematics Faculty Member, and also their Paul R. Halmos – Lester R. Ford Award for expository excellence for her article "Unknotting unknots" coauthored with Louis Kauffman. The award citation for the Alder Award cited her work in interactive learning, in guiding undergraduate mathematics students to become mentors to elementary school students, and in founding a summer research program at for underrepresented undergraduates, hosted at Seattle University.

References

External links
Home page

1980 births
Living people
21st-century American mathematicians
American women mathematicians
University of Washington alumni
Dartmouth College alumni
Topologists
Seattle University faculty
21st-century American women